Athar Shah Khan (Urdu:اطہر شاہ خان; January 1, 1943 – May 10, 2020) was a Pakistani comedian, poet and writer. He performed in many of his plays, dramas, and films scripted for Radio Pakistan, Pakistan Television, and Lollywood. He is more popularly known by his own-created character Jaidi. He is the recipient of the Pride of Performance Award (2001).

Early life and education
Born on 1st January 1943 in the Indian city of Rampur, Uttar Pradesh, Athar Shah Khan arrived in Karachi in 1947. Later, he settled in Lahore. He gained his primary education in Lahore and secondary education in Peshawar. He completed his graduate degree from Urdu Science College, now Federal Urdu University in Karachi. Later, he gained a Masters in Journalism from University of the Punjab Lahore. In 1957, he moved back to Karachi.

Career
Khan started his career as a writer from Radio Pakistan and wrote around 700 plays. His radio play Rang Hi Rang Jedi Ke Sang (1973) aired for more than 17 years. He gained popularity by acting out his own-created character Jaidi in a PTV series "Intezar Farmaye" which was telecasted in 1975. His first film as a writer was Bazi which was released in 1970. The film presented both Muhammad Ali and Nadeem together for the first time. He also wrote story of the platinum jubilee Punjabi film Manji Kithay Dahwan (1974).

Notable television plays
Khan provided many dramas on Pakistan Television, including:

Intezar Farmaiay 
Lakhon mein teen
Ba adab ba mulahiza hoshiyar 
Haye jaidi
Hello Hello
Burger Family

Filmography
 Bazi (1970)
 Manji Kithay Dahwan (1974)

Books
Taank Jhaank, a collection of humorous poetry.

Personal life
Khan was married and had four sons.

Death
Khan died in Karachi on 10 May 2020, at age 76. He suffered a heart attack and was also diabetic. His funeral prayer was offered at Masjid-i-Aqsa in Gulshan-i-Iqbal and he is buried in the Sakhi Hasan Graveyard, Karachi.

Awards
 Pride of Performance (2001)
 PTV Gold Medal (1989)

References

1943 births
2020 deaths
Pakistani male comedians
Pakistani male film actors
Pakistani male stage actors
Pakistani male television actors
Recipients of the Pride of Performance
Male actors from Karachi
Muslim male comedians
Male actors in Urdu cinema
Pakistani impressionists (entertainers)
Muhajir people
Federal Urdu University alumni
University of the Punjab alumni